Maria Viktorovna Butyrskaya (born 28 June 1972) is a Russian retired figure skater. She is the 1999 World champion and a three-time European champion — becoming the oldest skater and the first Russian to win the World ladies' title and the oldest skater to win the European ladies' title (2002 at age 29). Butyrskaya placed fourth at the 1998 Winter Olympics and sixth at the 2002 Winter Olympics. She won the Russian national title six times.

Personal life
Maria Butyrskaya was born on 28 June 1972 in Moscow. Her parents divorced after the birth of her younger brother.

In summer 2006, Butyrskaya married an ice hockey player, Vadim Khomitsky. As of 2010, he plays in Russia for Khimik's successor team Atlant Moscow Oblast. They have three children together.

Career

Early career
As a child, Butyrskaya was coached by Irina Nifontova for eight years. After she decided to retire, Butyrskaya had a couple of coaches, one of whom told her she had no talent, and then contacted Vladimir Korolov. He improved her compulsory figures but they were then dropped from competitions. After Korolov moved to Greece, Butyrskaya was coached by Viktor Kudriavtsev for several years until he told her that she was strong technically but he could not help her mentally. Her coach then became Elena Tchaikovskaia.

Butyrskaya competed for the Soviet Union until its dissolution and then began representing Russia. She first showed promise with a victory ahead of veterans Josée Chouinard and Tonya Harding at the 1992 Skate Canada International, with her free skate including five triples, and then placed 5th in her European Championship debut. At the 1993 World Championships, Butyrskaya did not advance past the qualifying round, which resulted in Russia having no entry in ladies' singles at the 1994 Olympics. In the 1993–94 season, she finished second behind Olga Markova at the Russian Nationals and 4th behind Markova at that year's Europeans. Markova thus received Russia's lone berth to the 1994 World Championships.

Seasons: 1994–95 to 1997–98
Butyrskaya regained her Russian national title in the 1994–95 season. At the 1995 European Championships, she was third after the short program but her long program dropped her to 7th, behind teammates Olga Markova (2nd) and Irina Slutskaya (5th). She again missed a berth to the World Championships.

Butyrskaya re-emerged as a contender in the 1995–96 season, winning a silver behind Michelle Kwan at the 1995 Nations Cup. She qualified for the first-ever Grand Prix of Figure Skating Final, where she finished seventh. She was one of two women to beat Kwan that year at Centennial on Ice, taking silver behind Slutskaya in  front of her home fans. Butyrskaya won her first European medal, a bronze, at the 1996 European Championships. At the 1996 World Championships in Edmonton, she missed a triple loop late in her free skate and finished 4th, losing the bronze to Slutskaya.

The 1996–97 would see Butyrskaya maintain her status as one of the World's top skaters, but struggle with consistency of her triple lutz, which she failed to land cleanly in any of her long programs of the season. After finishing 10th at the 1996 Skate America, she rebounded with a silver medal at the 1996 Trophée Lalique, finishing second to Kwan but ahead of rising star Tara Lipinski. Second in the short program at the Grand Prix Final, she dropped to fourth overall after missing her triple lutz in the free skate. At the 1997 European Championships, her 9th-ranked short program kept her off the podium despite placing second in the long program. At the 1997 World Championships in Lausanne, she placed third in the short program but her performance in the free skate dropped her to 5th overall.

Butyrskaya won her first European title at the 1998 European Championships. Ranked fifth in the short program, she completed seven triples in the long program to dethrone two-time defending champion Irina Slutskaya. She also beat that year's Grand Prix Final silver medalist, Tanja Szewczenko (3rd), who had beaten her twice that season. Butyrskaya was selected to represent Russia at the 1998 Winter Olympics and finished 4th in Nagano, finishing behind bronze medalist Chen Lu by a narrow margin. She went on to take her first World medal, bronze, at the 1998 World Championships. She finished behind silver medalist Slutskaya on a 5–4 split after a late fall at the end of a strong performance.

Seasons: 1998–99 to 2001–02
In the 1998–99 season, Butyrskaya repeated as the European champion. She took silver behind Uzbekistan's Tatiana Malinina at that year's Grand Prix Final after falling twice in the long program. Butyrskaya then won gold at the 1999 World Championships, finishing ahead of defending World champion Michelle Kwan. She received all first place ordinals in both the short and the long programs at the event, landing seven triples in her long program and receiving seven 5.9s for presentation.

Butyrskaya's car exploded outside her Moscow apartment on 23 December 1999. She said, "I don't see any other reason for it than jealousy, pure human jealousy." Tchaikovskaya stated "In my 40 years of coaching I have never seen anything like it. I guess it's this crime wave that has taken over our cities and lives lately." Entering the Russian Championships as the five-time defending champion, Butyrskaya finished second to Irina Slutskaya and then placed 3rd at the Grand Prix final behind Slutskaya and Kwan. At the 2000 European Championships, Butyrskaya was fourth in the short program but came away with a silver medal after a long program containing six triples, including a triple-triple sequence. At the 2000 World Championships, she placed first in the short program, scoring ten 5.9s. In 2000, the New York Times described her short program (Sarah Brightman's Scene d'Amour) as "flowing, lyrical skating...a performance of rare elegance and beauty." She dropped to third overall after missing two triple salchows in her long program and was awarded the bronze, her third World medal. Had she placed first or even second in the long program behind Kwan, she would have successfully defended her title.

In the 2000–01 season, Butyrskaya began attempting the triple flip jump in her short programs and won both the 2000 Sparkassen Cup on Ice and 2000 Trophée Lalique. After a narrow loss to Slutskaya at the 2000 NHK Trophy, she would initially not stand on the podium and finished fourth at the Grand Prix Final, completing only five out of 14 planned triples over the three segments. Butyrskaya took bronze at the Russian Nationals and silver at the 2001 European Championships, finishing behind Slutskaya at both events. At the 2001 World Championships, her performance in the qualifying round kept her out of the final flight in the short program. Although she placed third in the free skate with six triples and three 5.9s for presentation, she finished fourth overall, narrowly edged for the bronze by Sarah Hughes.

In the 2001–02 season, Butyrskaya was the only woman to win both of her Grand Prix assignments and entered the Grand Prix Final as the top qualifier but finished fourth. She won her third European title at the 2002 European Championships, defeating Slutskaya in a major event for the first time in three years. She finished sixth at her second Olympics and ended her amateur career at the 2002 World Championships, withdrawing from the competition after skating poorly in the qualifying round.

Butyrskaya performed a combination spin that involved clasping her arms and hands behind her back while transitioning to back camel, sit and scratch spins. She often participated in choreographing her programs and in designing her costumes.

Later career
After retiring from competition, Butyrskaya began coaching, working primarily with young skaters. She is based at the Olympic Reserve Skating School in Moscow.

Programs

Results 
GP: Champions Series / Grand Prix

References

External links

 
 
 

1972 births
Russian female single skaters
Figure skaters at the 1998 Winter Olympics
Figure skaters at the 2002 Winter Olympics
Living people
Olympic figure skaters of Russia
Figure skaters from Moscow
Soviet female single skaters
World Figure Skating Championships medalists
European Figure Skating Championships medalists
Universiade medalists in figure skating
Goodwill Games medalists in figure skating
Universiade silver medalists for Russia
Competitors at the 1995 Winter Universiade
Russian State University of Physical Education, Sport, Youth and Tourism alumni
Competitors at the 1994 Goodwill Games